The Flehe Bridge, is a single tower cable stayed bridge located in Düsseldorf, over the Rhine. It connects the A 46 motorway from the left bank of the Rhine (Neuss, Aachen, Heinsberg district, the Netherlands) with the Bergisches Land on the right bank (Wuppertal, Solingen, Hagen) and the south of Düsseldorf. It forms at the same time the southern part of the ring of motorways around Düsseldorf.  It includes a pedestrian and cyclist strip.

This bridge opened in 1979 and eliminated a considerable amount of transit traffic south of Düsseldorf and the South Bridge (B 1), both then the only southern access from the left bank of the Rhine to Düsseldorf. Also, it connected the A 46 with the A 57. The Flehe Bridge has in each direction three vehicle lanes and a hard shoulder. The bridge does not cross the Rhine in a right angle, in order to preserve the area of water procurement of the old water company Flehe. A remarkable feature of the Flehe bridge is the reinforced concrete suspension tower, which looks like a Ypsilon turned on its head. In the handles of the pylons an elevator and stairs are accommodated above the roadway. The handles are in bridge longitudinal direction only  broad. They were manufactured with a climbing formwork. A structural steelwork has the  river opening stretching far as if cover.

See also 
 List of bridges in Germany

References

External links 
 
Flehe Bridge at structurae.de

Cable-stayed bridges in Germany
Road bridges in Germany
Bridges completed in 1979
Bridges over the Rhine
Buildings and structures in Düsseldorf